Christopher S. Hill (born 1942) is an American philosopher and William Herbert Perry Faunce Professor of Philosophy at Brown University.
He is known for his expertise on consciousness and philosophy of mind.

Career
Hill previously taught at the University of Pittsburgh, Case Western Reserve University, the University of Michigan, the University of Arkansas, and Massachusetts Institute of Technology.
He has held various fellowships from the National Endowment for the Humanities and is a fellow at the National Humanities Center. Hill is a former editor of Philosophical Topics and a former associate editor of Noûs.

Books
 Meaning, Mind, and Knowledge (Oxford University Press, 2014)
 Consciousness (Cambridge University Press, 2009) 
 Thought and World (Cambridge University Press, 2002)
 Sensations (Cambridge University Press, 1991)

References

External links
 Christopher S. Hill at Brown University

21st-century American philosophers
Analytic philosophers
Philosophy academics
Harvard University alumni
Brown University faculty
Living people
Philosophy journal editors
1942 births
Philosophers of mind
Philosophers of language
Fellows of the National Endowment for the Humanities
University of Michigan faculty
University of Pittsburgh faculty
Case Western Reserve University faculty
University of Arkansas faculty